Derek Armstrong (born June 19, 1981) is a former Canadian football guard. He was drafted in the fifth round with the 38th overall pick in the 2006 CFL Draft by the Calgary Stampeders. He played CIS Football with St. Francis Xavier University. During the 2009 CFL season the Calgary Stampeders  traded defensive lineman Odell Willis and receivers Titus Ryan, and Jabari Arthur to the Winnipeg Blue Bombers in exchange for receivers Romby Bryant and Arjei Franklin. These two teams also agreed that Armstrong would be involved in the trade, but would remain Calgary property until the end of the season, so following the 2009 season Armstrong was traded to Winnipeg.

External links
 Just Sports Stats
 Calgary Stampeders bio

1981 births
Living people
Canadian football offensive linemen
Calgary Stampeders players
People from Perth, Ontario
Players of Canadian football from Ontario
St. Francis Xavier X-Men football players